Tainá Müller (born 1 June 1982) is a Brazilian actress. She is the oldest of three sisters, actress Tuti Müller and MTV VJ Titi Müller.

Career
At the age of 19, she began work as a VJ for MTV in Rio Grande do Sul, as well as working as a model, doing seasons in Milan, Hong Kong and Bangkok.

In 2005, she moved to São Paulo and began to study theater. In 2007, she debuted in cinema with the film Cão Sem Dono, for which she was awarded Best Actress in Brazilian festivals. Shortly after she debuted in television on the Rede Globo show Eterna Magia as Laura Mascarenhas.

In 2014, she joined the cast of the soap opera Em Família, in which she plays Marina, a lesbian photographer who is in love with Clara Fernandes (Giovanna Antonelli).

Personal life
On 30 November 2013, Tainá Müller married her husband Henrique Sauer in a simple shamanic wedding ceremony in Mexico. Muller and husband welcomed their first child in April 2016.

Film

Television

Awards and nominations

References

External links

1982 births
Living people
People from Porto Alegre
Brazilian people of German descent
Brazilian television actresses
Brazilian female models
Brazilian film actresses
Brazilian soap opera actresses
Actresses from Rio Grande do Sul
21st-century Brazilian actresses
Brazilian models of German descent